Neil Nugent (6 November 1926 – 12 April 2018) was a British field hockey player and RAF Wing Commander who competed in the 1952 Summer Olympics. Nugent was a member of the British field hockey team, which won the bronze medal. He played two matches as forward, but due to injury did not appear in all of the games and did not receive a medal with the rest of team. He was retroactively awarded his medal in 2010, along with one of his teammates, 58 years on. He died in April 2018 at the age of 91. He studied in St.George's College, Mussoorie, Uttarakhand - INDIA from 1934 to 1944.

References

External links
 
Neil Nugent's profile at databaseOlympics
British Olympians Sir Derek Day and Neil Nugent set to Receive Medals 58 Years Late

1926 births
2018 deaths
Place of birth missing
British male field hockey players
Field hockey players at the 1952 Summer Olympics
Medalists at the 1952 Summer Olympics
Olympic bronze medallists for Great Britain
Olympic field hockey players of Great Britain
Olympic medalists in field hockey
Royal Air Force officers